William Mesguich (born 1972) is a French actor and director, the son of theatre director Daniel Mesguich. With Philippe Fenwick, he created La Compagnie de l'Étreinte in 1998.

Theatre 

  by Robert Garnier
 1980 : Athalie by Racine, directed by Roger Planchon, TNP Villeurbanne, Théâtre national de l'Odéon  
 Marie Tudor by Victor Hugo
 L’Histoire qu’on ne connaîtra jamais by Hélène Cixous
 The Trojan Women by Seneca the Younger
 Fin de partie by Samuel Beckett
 L’Échange by Paul Claudel
 Alice Droz by 
 Fin du monde chez Gogo 
 1996: La Périchole by Jacques Offenbach, directed by Robert Angebaud, Théâtre du Jour Agen 
 1998: La Légende des porteurs de souffle by Philippe Fenwick
 1999: Des saisons en enfer by Pierre Bourgeade and Marius Constant, directed by Daniel Mesguich, 
 1999: La Seconde Surprise de l'amour by Marivaux, directed by Daniel Mesguich, Théâtre de l'Athénée-Louis-Jouvet
 2000: The Prince of Homburg by Heinrich von Kleist, directed by Daniel Mesguich, Théâtre de l'Athénée-Louis-Jouvet
 2001: The Devil and the Good Lord by Jean-Paul Sartre, directed by Daniel Mesguich, Théâtre de l'Athénée-Louis-Jouvet
 2003: Antony and Cleopatra by William Shakespeare, directed by Daniel Mesguich, Théâtre de l'Athénée-Louis-Jouvet
 2003: Tartuffe by Molière, directed by Pierre Debauche
 2003: Exit the King by Eugène Ionesco, directed by Pierre Debauche
 2003: Paul Schippel ou le prolétaire bourgeois by Carl Sternheim, directed by Jean-Louis Benoit, Théâtre de , Théâtre national de Nice, 
 2004: Il était une fois… les Fables by Jean de La Fontaine, directed by William Mesguich, Théâtre Georges Simenon Rosny sous Bois
 2004: As you like it by William Shakespeare, directed bye William Mesguich, Théâtre Georges Simenon Rosny sous Bois, 
 2004: Tohu-Bohu, [directed by William Mesguich, Espace Rachi Paris
 2004: Monsieur Septime, Solange et la casserole by Philippe Fenwick, directed by William Mesguich, L’Atalante Paris, Théâtre Victor Hugo Bagneux
 2005: The Prince of Homburg by Heinrich von Kleist, directed by Daniel Mesguich, Théâtre de la Criée, Théâtre de l'Athénée-Louis-Jouvet
 2005: Il était une fois… les Fables by Jean de La Fontaine, directed by William Mesguich, 
 2006: Ruy Blas de Victor Hugo, directed by William Mesguich, Scène Watteau Nogent-sur-Marne, 
 2006: Comment devient-on chamoune ? by Charlotte Escamez, directed by William Mesguich, Théâtre Georges Simenon Rosny sous Bois, Sudden Théâtre
 2006: Confusion, la Légende de l’étoile by Philippe Fenwick, directed by William Mesguich, Théâtre Georges Simenon Rosny sous Bois
 2007: L'Entretien de M. Descartes avec M. Pascal le jeune by Jean-Claude Brisville, directed by Daniel Mesguich, Théâtre de l'Œuvre
 2007: La Veuve, la couturière et la commère by Charlotte Escamez, directed by William Mesguich, L’Atalante Paris
 2008: Du cristal à la fumée by Jacques Attali, directed by Daniel Mesguich, Théâtre du Rond-Point
 2008: L'Entretien de M. Descartes avec M. Pascal le jeune by Jean-Claude Brisville, directed by Daniel Mesguich, tour
 2008: La Belle et la bête by Jeanne-Marie Leprince de Beaumont, directed by William Mesguich, Théâtre Mouffetard, 
 2008: Ruy Blas by Victor Hugo, directed by William Mesguich, Théâtre du Chêne Noir 
 2009: L'Entretien de M. Descartes avec M. Pascal le jeune by Jean-Claude Brisville, directed by Daniel Mesguich, tour
 2009: L'Initiatie show, directed by William Mesguich, gymnase de l'initiative
 2009: Il était une fois ... la création du monde, directed by William Mesguich, Bouffes Parisiens
 2010: Life Is a Dream by Pedro Calderón de la Barca, directed by William Mesguich, Théâtre 13, 
 2010: L'Entretien de M. Descartes avec M. Pascal le jeune by Jean-Claude Brisville, directed by Daniel Mesguich, Théâtre national de Nice
 2010: L'Histoire du soldat by Charles-Ferdinand Ramuz, Igor Stravinski, directed by William Mesguich 
 2010: Il était une fois... les fables by Jean de La Fontaine, directed by William Mesguich, Théâtre de la Criée
 2010: Agatha by Marguerite Duras, directed by Daniel Mesguich, with William Mesguich and Sarah Mesguich, Théâtre du Chêne Noir-Avignon
 2013: Hamlet directed by Daniel mesguich, with william mesguish au théâtre national de Nice.
 2015–2017: Noces de Sang by Federico García Lorca directed by William Mesguich, Chêne noir Avignon and tour in France
 2019: Dans les forêts de Sibérie adapted from Sylvain Tesson eponymous book.

Filmography 
 Television
 2008:  by Nina Companeez
 2009:  by 
 2010: Du cristal à la fumée by Philippe Miquel
 2010:  by 
 2011:  by

External links 
 Interview de William Mesguich
 Le fol été de William Mesguich, trois fois à l'affiche du Off d'Avignon
 William MESGUICH, la tentation de l’infini
 

French male stage actors
French film directors
French theatre directors
1972 births
Living people